Raymond Francis Rourke (October 10, 1917 – May 24, 2004) was an American politician and firefighter who served for many years in the Massachusetts House of Representatives, and as the seventy third Mayor of Lowell, Massachusetts.

References

1917 births
2004 deaths
Democratic Party members of the Massachusetts House of Representatives
Lowell, Massachusetts City Council members
Mayors of Lowell, Massachusetts
American Roman Catholics
United States Navy personnel of World War II
20th-century American politicians
United States Navy sailors